Kazaiah Roy Barrett Sterling (born 9 November 1998) is an English professional footballer who plays as a forward for USL League One side South Georgia Tormenta.

Career
Born in Enfield and of Jamaican descent, Sterling attended Winchmore School and was in the youth programme at Leyton Orient until Tottenham signed him on 1 July 2015. He represented Tottenham in youth level competitions and played in the EFL Trophy against AFC Wimbledon and Barnet. On 6 December 2017, he made his competitive senior debut for the club, coming on as an 88th-minute substitute for Dele Alli in Spurs' final Champions League group game against APOEL Nicosia, a 3–0 win at Wembley Stadium.

In the January 2019 transfer window Sterling was loaned out to Sunderland for the remainder of the season. He made his EFL League One debut on 2 February 2019, in a 1–0 home win over AFC Wimbledon, as a 59th-minute substitute for Charlie Wyke. Sterling scored his first senior goal on 3 April 2019, in a 3–0 away win against Accrington Stanley.

In August 2019, Sterling went out on a season long loan to Doncaster Rovers. He scored his first goal for Doncaster in an EFL Trophy tie against Lincoln City on 3 September 2019.

After the Doncaster deal was cut short due to injury, Sterling signed for League Two club Leyton Orient on a six-month loan.

On 9 October 2020, Sterling joined Southend United on loan. He scored his first goal for the club on 10 November, in an EFL Trophy tie against Colchester United.
On 5 January 2021, Sterling returned to Tottenham, after his loan at Southend came to an end.

On 1 February 2021, Sterling joined Scottish side Greenock Morton on loan until the end of the season.

On 4 October 2021, Sterling made his debut for Isthmian League Premier Division side Potters Bar Town, providing an assist before the game was abandoned.

On 28 February 2022, Sterling made the move to the United States, signing with third-tier USL League One side South Georgia Tormenta. He had an immediate impact, leading the club in goals and helping clinch a playoff spot. The club would go on to win the league championship on Sterling's four goals in the playoffs. He was named MVP of the championship match.

Career statistics

References

External links
Kazaiah Sterling at Tottenham Hotspur.
England profile at The Football Association

1998 births
Living people
Footballers from the London Borough of Enfield
English people of Jamaican descent
Association football forwards
English footballers
England youth international footballers
Leyton Orient F.C. players
Tottenham Hotspur F.C. players
Sunderland A.F.C. players
Doncaster Rovers F.C. players
Southend United F.C. players
English Football League players
Black British sportspeople
Greenock Morton F.C. players
Scottish Professional Football League players
Potters Bar Town F.C. players
Isthmian League players
Tormenta FC players
English expatriate footballers
Expatriate soccer players in the United States
English expatriate sportspeople in the United States